Iridomyrmex phillipensis is a species of ant in the genus Iridomyrmex. Described by Heterick and Shattuck in 2011, the ant is the only species endemic to Australia to not actually live in the country itself, but instead lives in territory that belongs to Australia.

Etymology
The name of the ant is in reference to the location of the first specimens of the species was collected.

References

Iridomyrmex
Hymenoptera of Australia
Insects described in 2011